Safety Catch is a 1970 French thriller film directed by Yves Boisset and starring Bruno Cremer. The film is based on the novel A Private Venus by Giorgio Scerbanenco.

Cast
 Bruno Cremer as Duca Lamberti / Lucas Lamberti
 Renaud Verley as Davide Auseri
 Marianne Comtell as Livia Ussaro
 Raffaella Carrà as Alberta Radelli
 Mario Adorf as Le sadique aux cheveux longs
 Jean Martin as Le majordome
 Rufus as The photographer's assistant
 Claudio Gora as Le docteur Carrua
 Marina Berti as La soeur d'Alberta
 Vanna Brosio as Marilina
 Agostina Belli as  Mara

Plot
A doctor removed from the order for euthanasia is called by a man to help his son depressed since the suicide of his girlfriend. But in the handbag of the deceased, an undeveloped film is discovered by the doctor who decides to investigate the alleged suicide of the young woman.

References

1970 films
1970s thriller films
Films based on works by Giorgio Scerbanenco
Films directed by Yves Boisset
French thriller films
1970s French-language films
1970s French films